OpenFrame is a mainframe rehosting solution developed by TmaxSoft that aims to help customers move existing mainframe assets to the cloud quickly and with minimal risk. It replaces legacy CICS/IMS/JES mainframe engines and shifts business applications written in legacy code like COBOL and PL/I to Linux. This allows reduced licensing costs compared to the mainframe.

It also includes a test tool which helps users determine if the migration will preserve functionality without additional adjustments. 

The current version of OpenFrame is 7.0, which was first released in Japan in September, 2015. The previous version, OpenFrame 6.0 was released in the U.S. market in 2009.

Mainframe Migration 
Organizations that run on mainframes tend to have difficulty with costs and agility. Rehosting is one approach an organization may take to migrate their mainframe operations to the cloud, with other options including batch-job migration and full re-engineering. With the rehosting option, the entire mainframe is emulated on the cloud so that the end-user experience is essentially unchanged.

Compatibility 

OpenFrame advertises the following components can be migrated and continue working without modification, provided they run on open systems components such as Linux:
 Compilers
 COBOL
 PL/I
 Assembler
 Datasets
 Flat files
 GDGs
 VSAM
 Databases
 IMS
 DB2
 IDMS
 Oracle
 Online Systems
 CICS
 Batch Systems
 JES
 JCL

Notable Users

Kela 
Kela, the Finnish government agency in charge of the nation's social security programs, used OpenFrame to rehost its mainframe. The agency had estimated that the rising costs of maintaining a mainframe would become prohibitive in the near future, and saw a shortage of IT professionals skilled in working in a mainframe environment. As a result, Kela was able to lift over 10 million lines of code to the rehosted environment and reduce the cost of system maintenance. Since the rehosted iteration was functionally similar to the mainframe system, Kela was also able to keep its existing IT staff in place.

GE Capital 
GE Capital opted to use OpenFrame to modernize its aging IT infrastructure, which was mostly made up of mainframes. Before rehosting, the GE Capital system was managing 5 million account schedules, over 382 interfaces, with up to 1,700 concurrent users, resulting in an average of 3.5 million transactions per day. In addition to high costs, the disaster recovery process was slow and the system was generally inefficient. OpenFrame allowed GE Capital to rehost without redeveloping any applications or changing the user interface. The results included 66% reduction in costs associated with running the system and a 240% increase in disaster recovery speed.

References 

Proprietary software
Software maintenance
Installation software